Rathaus Schöneberg (Schöneberg Town Hall) is a station on the  line of the Berlin underground train network.

Designed by architect Johann Emil Schaudt, who also built the Bismarck Monument in Hamburg, the station was first opened in 1910 as Stadtpark (City Park). From 1940 to 1951 it was closed due to damage sustained during the Second World War. It re-opened under the current name in 1951.

References

U4 (Berlin U-Bahn) stations
Buildings and structures in Tempelhof-Schöneberg
Art Nouveau architecture in Berlin
Railway stations in Germany opened in 1910
Art Nouveau railway stations